Spyridoula Karydi (born 30 January 2001) is a Greek triple jumper. She represented Greece at the 2022 European Athletics Championships in Munich, taking the 9th place in the final.

Competition record

References

External links

2001 births
Living people
Greek female triple jumpers
Athletes from Athens